Our Lady of Grace and St Teresa of Avila is a Grade II listed Roman Catholic church at 1 King's Road, Chingford, London, E4 7HP.

It was built in 1930 by the architect George W. Martyn with extensions in 1939 and 1956.

References

External links 
 
 Website – Our Lady of Grace and St Teresa of Avila Catholic Church

Grade II listed buildings in the London Borough of Waltham Forest
Grade II listed Roman Catholic churches in England
Churches in the London Borough of Waltham Forest
Grade II listed churches in London
Roman Catholic Diocese of Brentwood